Stander, or Ständer, is a surname. Notable people with the surname include:

Andre Stander (1946–1984), South African police officer and bank robber
Brynard Stander (born 1990), South African rugby union player
Burry Stander (1987–2013), South African cyclist
CJ Stander (born 1990), South African rugby union player
Hatto Ständer (1929–2000), German church musician, academic and composer
Jan Stander (born 1982), Scottish cricketer
Lionel Stander (1908–1994), American actor
Ron Stander (1944–2022), American boxer and referee

Afrikaans-language surnames